Hedley is a surname. Notable people with the surname include:

 Charles Hedley (1862–1926), malacologist from England and then Australia, winner of the Clarke Award
 Charles Hedley (rugby league) (1881–1942), Australian rugby footballer
 Jack Hedley (1929–2021), British actor
 John Cuthbert Hedley (1837–1915), British writer and bishop
 John Prescott Hedley (1876-1957), British physician
 Joseph Hedley (1749/50-1826), English quilter and murder victim
 Lieut. Robert Hedley (1857–1884), English captain of the Royal Engineers in the 1878 FA Cup Final
 Thomas Hedley (born 1942/43), publisher
 Colonel Sir Walter Coote Hedley (1865–1937), English army officer and amateur cricketer
 William Hedley (1779–1843), British industrial engineer

Fictional characters
 Roland Hedley, reporter in the comic strip Doonesbury

See also
Headlee
Headley (surname)